Exponentiation is a mathematical operation.

Exponent may also refer to:

Mathematics 
 List of exponential topics
 Exponential function, a function of a certain form
 Matrix exponential, a matrix function on square matrices
 The least common multiple of a periodic group

Statistics 
 Exponential distribution, a probability distribution
 Exponential family, a parametric set of probability distributions of a certain form
 Exponential growth, a specific way that a quantity may increase over time
 Exponential decay, decreasing quantity at a rate proportional to current value

Linguistics 
 Exponent (linguistics), the expression of one or more grammatical properties by sound.

Music 
 The Exponents, a New Zealand rock group

Publications 
 Purdue Exponent, a student newspaper of Purdue University
 Woman's Exponent, a publication of The Church of Jesus Christ of Latter-day Saints
 Exponent II, a quarterly periodical for Latter-day Saint women
 The Exponent (Montana State University), a student newspaper of Montana State University – Bozeman
 The Brooklyn Exponent, a weekly newspaper serving communities in Michigan
 The Jewish Exponent, a weekly community newspaper in Philadelphia, Pennsylvania

Companies 
 Exponent (consulting firm), an American engineering and scientific consulting firm

Other uses 
 Currency exponent, used in ISO 4271
 Exponent CMS, an enterprise software framework and content management system
 Exponent (podcast), podcast co-hosted by Ben Thompson

See also
 Exponential (disambiguation)